Colliers is a town on the Avalon Peninsula in Newfoundland and Labrador, Canada. It is in Division 1 on Conception Bay.

According to the 2016 Statistics Canada Census: the area had a population of 654, with 424 dwellings.

Colliers was considered by John Guy and his associates as a preferred place for the first settlement in North America. The area that became known as Cupers Cove (Cupids) was chosen to great tragedy. If Colliers had been chosen, this tragedy might not have occurred. Thus Colliers would have been the first permanent settlement in North America.

Famous residents of Colliers include former Lt. Gov. James A. McGrath, actor John Ryan and musician Terry McDonald.

Demographics 

See also
 List of cities and towns in Newfoundland and Labrador

References

External links 
 Colliers Volunteer Fire Department
 Colliers - Encyclopedia of Newfoundland and Labrador, vol. 1, p. 480-481.

Populated coastal places in Canada
Towns in Newfoundland and Labrador